Bhikawadi Khurd is a small village in Sangli district of Maharashtra state (India). Bhikawadi is 14 km from Vita. Bhikawadi is a known for God Shrinath temple and also for Jatra (street festival). Bhikawadi hosts "Jatra" on "Gudhi Padawa" of every year. Khurd and Kalan are Persian words which mean small and big, respectively. When two villages have same name, they are distinguished as with these words in their names.

External links

Villages in Sangli district